Cape Vankarem is a cape in the Chukchi Sea on the northern coast of Chukotka between Cape Schmidt to the west and  Kolyuchinskaya Bay to the east. It projects from a sandspit across the mouth of a lagoon into which flows the Vankarem River. 
At the mouth of the lagoon is the village of Vankarem, a Chukchi settlement.

The area around cape Vankarem is bounded by narrow beach ridges and swales with numerous inlets and coastal lagoons.

History
East of Cape Vankarem, Adolf Erik Nordenskiöld observed remains of ancient dwellings, as well as numerous bones of reindeers and bears. Walruses, and whales, including bowhead and gray whales, are abundant in the waters off Cape Vankarem.

Climate

See also
 Captain Vladimir Voronin

References

 Armstrong, T., The Russians in the Arctic, London, 1958.

External links

Vankarem